Mark Rohan (born 26 July 1981) is an Irish cyclist, and a former Gaelic football and wheelchair basketball player. He competes in the H1 disability sport classification as he has been paralysed from the chest down since a spinal cord injury in 2001. Rohan won two gold medals in the 2012 Summer Paralympics.

He won a gold medal in the Men's road time trial H1 event and in the Men's road race H1 event.

References

External links 
Official Site
London 2012 Profile
Interview at Joe.ie

1981 births
Living people
Cyclists at the 2012 Summer Paralympics
Paralympic gold medalists for Ireland
Paralympic cyclists of Ireland
Medalists at the 2012 Summer Paralympics
Paralympic medalists in cycling